Paul Bishop is a thirty-five year law enforcement official of the Los Angeles Police Department. Paul Bishop's career included a three-year tour with his department's Anti-Terrorist Division and over twenty-five years’ experience in the investigation of sex crimes. His Special Assaults Units regularly produced the highest number of detective initiated arrests and highest crime clearance rates in the city. Twice honored as Detective of the Year, Paul also received the Quality and Productivity Commission Award from the City of Los Angeles. As a nationally recognized interrogator, Paul starred as the lead interrogator and driving force behind the ABC reality show Take The Money and Run from producer Jerry Bruckheimer. Based on his expertise in deception detection, he currently conducts interrogation seminars for law enforcement, military, and human resource organizations. Paul has published fourteen novels, including four in his L.A.P.D. Detective Fey Croaker series, and one collection of short stories which includes a novelette featuring Croaker. He has also written numerous scripts for episodic television and feature films. He is the co-creator and editor of the Fight Card series of hardboiled boxing novels, which includes over forty titles, published under the pseudonym Jack Tunney. Paul's own entries in the series are Fight Card: Felony Fists and Fight Card: Swamp Walloper, both featuring the two-fisted cop turned fighter, Patrick ‘Felony’ Flynn. His latest novel, Lie Catchers, begins a new series featuring top LAPD interrogators Ray Pagan and Calamity Jane Randall.

Career
Novelist, screenwriter, and television personality, Paul Bishop spent 35 years with the Los Angeles Police Department where he was twice honored as Detective of the Year. He continues to work privately as an interrogation and deception expert. His fifteen novels include five in his LAPD Homicide Detective Fey Croaker series. His latest novel, Lie Catchers, begins a new series featuring top LAPD interrogators Ray Pagan and "Calamity Jane" Randall.

Works

Series

Calico Jack Walker/Tina Tamiko
Hot Pursuit (Previous title: Citadel Run – 1988; e-Book 2011)
Deep Water (Previous title: Sand Against the Tide – 1990; e-Book 2011)

Ian Chapel
Penalty Shot (Previous title: Chapel of the Ravens – 1991; e-Book 2011)

Fey Croaker
Croaker: Kill Me Again (1994; e-Book 2011)
Croaker: Twice Dead (1996; e-Book 2011 called "Grave Sins")
Croaker: Tequila Mockingbird (1997; e-Book 2011)
Croaker: Chalk Wispers (2000; e-Book 2011)
Croaker: Pattern Of Behavior and Other Stories (2005; e-Book 2011)(The title story in this collection and a second short story both feature Croaker)

Other Novels
Shroud Of Vengeance (1987)
Running Wylde – Short Stories (e-Book 2011)
Suspicious Minds (e-Book 2011)
Felony Fists (as Jack Tunney) (Paperback / e-Book 2011)
Swamp Walloper (as Jack Tunney) (Paperback / e-Book 2013)
Lie Catchers (Paperback / e-Book 2015)

References

External links

American crime fiction writers
Los Angeles Police Department officers
Living people
American male novelists
American male screenwriters
American television writers
American male television writers
Year of birth missing (living people)